Reggie Arosemena Henríquez (born 9 September 1986 in Panama City, Panama) is a football midfielder who most recently played in Panama for Liga Panameña de Futbol team Alianza.

Club career
Arosemena started his career at Sporting San Miguelito before joining giants Tauro. He moved to newly promoted top tier debutants Río Abajo in summer 2012.

In summer 2014 he joined Chorrillo and in January 2015 he left them for Alianza.

In May 2015, Arosemena was hurt in a car accident which killed another person.

International career
Arosemena was part of the Panama U-20 squad that participated in the 2005 FIFA World Youth Cup in Netherlands.

He made his senior debut for Panama in an August 2006 friendly match against Peru and has earned a total of 13 caps, scoring 1 goal. In 2007 Arosemena was part of the Panama that won the 2007 UNCAF Nations Cup in El Salvador.

International goals
Scores and results list Panama's goal tally first.

Honours

Club
Liga Panameña de Fútbol (1): 2007 (A)

References

External links

1986 births
Living people
Sportspeople from Panama City
Association football midfielders
Panamanian footballers
Panama international footballers
2007 UNCAF Nations Cup players
Sporting San Miguelito players
Tauro F.C. players
Unión Deportivo Universitario players
Alianza Panama players